"The Night Gwen Stacy Died", alternatively known as "The Green Goblin's Last Stand", is a story arc of the Marvel Comics comic book series The Amazing Spider-Man #121–122 (June-July 1973). The two-issue story was written by Gerry Conway, with pencil art by Gil Kane and inking by John Romita Sr. and Tony Mortellaro.

The story features a confrontation between Spider-Man and the Green Goblin. Having discovered Spider-Man's identity, the Green Goblin abducts Spider-Man's girlfriend Gwen Stacy. Gwen is killed during the battle, and a subsequent fight results in the Goblin's death.

Prior to the release of the story arc, it was not considered common for major members of a superhero's supporting cast to be killed. As a result, "The Night Gwen Stacy Died" is widely regarded as the most pivotal Spider-Man story outside of his origin and one of the most important comics of all time; its release is widely said to have ended the Silver Age of Comic Books and jumpstarted the Bronze Age, which further increased the emphasis on more mature subject matter pioneered by the Silver Age.  Gwen's death and the story at large had major impact on the Marvel brand, as they directly led to increased emphasis on Luke Cage and Mary Jane Watson, the creation of the Punisher, and Green Goblin's status as Spider-Man's archenemy in alternate media and, following his resurrection during the Clone Saga, the comics.

The arc's popularity has led it to be alluded to in various alternate media, most notably partial direct adaptations in the feature films Spider-Man (2002) and The Amazing Spider-Man 2 (2014).

Plot

Prior to this arc, Norman Osborn had been the Green Goblin, but due to amnesia, he had suspended his identity as the supervillain and forgotten that Spider-Man is Peter Parker. Also, Harry Osborn, Parker's best friend and Norman's son, became addicted to drugs and was sequestered in the Osborn home for detoxification. Norman's parental grief, combined with financial pressure, triggered a breakdown resulting in Norman Osborn remembering his Goblin identity and again targeting Spider-Man and his loved ones for misery.

The Green Goblin abducts Peter's girlfriend, Gwen Stacy, and lures Spider-Man to a tower of either the Brooklyn Bridge (as depicted in the art) or the George Washington Bridge (as given in the text). The Goblin and Spider-Man clash, and the Goblin hurls Gwen off the bridge. Spider-Man shoots a web strand at her legs and catches her. As he pulls her up, he thinks he has saved her, however he quickly realizes she is dead. Unsure whether her neck was broken by the whiplash from her sudden stop or had been already broken by the Goblin prior to her fall, he blames himself for her death. A note on the letters page of The Amazing Spider-Man #125 states: "It saddens us to say that the whiplash effect she underwent when Spidey's webbing stopped her so suddenly was, in fact, what killed her.", although later issues would reveal Gwen died from the fall itself.

The Green Goblin escapes, and Spider-Man cries over Gwen's corpse and swears revenge. The following issue, Spider-Man tracks the Green Goblin to a warehouse and beats him but cannot bring himself to kill him. The Goblin uses the opportunity to send his glider to impale Spider-Man from behind. Warned by his spider-sense, Spider-Man dodges, and the glider instead impales the Green Goblin, seemingly killing him. Later, a devastated Parker, back at home, encounters an equally shocked and saddened Mary Jane Watson, who has lost a close friend with Gwen's death, and the two attempt to comfort each other in the wake of their loss.

Significance
The death of Gwen Stacy shocked the American comic book community. Previously, it had been unthinkable to kill off such an important character—the girlfriend of a protagonist with a large fanbase. Generally, a superhero did not fail so disastrously unless it was part of their origin story.  This story arc has been proposed as a marker of beginning of the end of the Silver Age of Comic Books, and the beginning of the darker, grittier Bronze Age.
The subsequent tendency for the wives and girlfriends of male superheroes to meet grim fates was referred to as "The Gwen Stacy Syndrome" by the Comics Buyer's Guide.
A fan poll conducted by Marvel Comics for their series The 100 Greatest Marvels of All Time voted The Amazing Spider-Man (vol. 1) #121 and 122 to be the 6th and 19th greatest issues of all time, respectively.

Development

Behind the scenes
Inker John Romita Sr. recalled in a 2015 interview how the character to be killed off for what became The Night Gwen Stacy Died was selected. Romita and Amazing Spider-Man writer Gerry Conway were initially asked by the editors to kill off Aunt May. They organized a plot session at Conway's apartment and disagreed with killing Aunt May, opining that if she were to die, Peter would not have to worry about her anymore and be no longer treated as a child again, thus deciding to kill either Mary Jane Watson or Gwen Stacy. Romita proposed to kill the latter as the former served as a comical character at the time, taking inspiration of the decisions to kill off character from Milton Caniff, author of the Terry and the Pirates and Steve Canyon comic strips.

Writer Conway's memory of how Gwen was selected as the character to be killed off is more contradictory: in 2008 he told author Sean Howe that it was he and editor Roy Thomas who first discussed killing off Aunt May, but when Romita heard about this he suggested that Gwen was a more suitable candidate. Later, during a 2013 interview at the Emerald City Comic Con, Conway contradicted himself by claiming that it was initially Romita's idea to kill off Aunt May and that he disagreed and had to talk Romita out of that choice.

Stan Lee, co-creator of both Spider-Man and Gwen Stacy, was consulted by Conway, editor Roy Thomas and Romita about killing Gwen Stacy. When asked about how he accepted the decision, Lee said: "... I was just getting ready to go to Europe on some sort of a business trip... to meet somebody to discuss something about Marvel. And I think I wasn't thinking too clearly, because when they said, 'We'd like to kill Gwen Stacy,' I said, 'Well, if that's what you want to do, okay.' All I wanted to do was get them out of the office so I could finish packing and get out of there. ... and when I came back and found out that Gwen had been killed, I thought 'Why would they do that? Why would Gerry write anything like that?' And I had to be reminded later on that I had perhaps reluctantly or perhaps carelessly said 'Okay' when they asked me." Conversely, Romita recalls that Lee was already out of the country when the decision was made and that they took a time to talk him into it, yet Lee remained very upset.

In the comic book collection The 100 Greatest Marvels of All Time: #9-6 (Amazing Spider-Man #121 was the #6 comic), Conway explained that Gwen and Peter were a "perfect couple", but taking that relationship to the next level (i.e. marriage or at least Peter revealing his secret identity to her) would "betray everything that Spider-Man was about", i.e. personal tragedy and anguish as root of Peter's life as Spider-Man. Killing Gwen Stacy was a perfect opportunity to kill two birds with one stone: breaking up the "unfitting" relationship and reinforcing the element of personal tragedy which was, in his opinion, the essence of Spider-Man.

Bridge
The bridge in the original issue of Amazing Spider-Man #121 was stated in the text to be the George Washington Bridge. The Pulse #4 (Sept. 2004) also states the bridge to be the George Washington Bridge.

The art of The Amazing Spider-Man #121, however, depicts the Brooklyn Bridge. Some reprints of the issue have had the text amended and now state the bridge to be the Brooklyn Bridge rather than the George Washington Bridge. Titles supporting the Brooklyn Bridge include The Amazing Spider-Man #147–148 (1975), The Amazing Spider-Man Annual #21 (1987), and Daredevil v. 2 #8 (2000).  In a television interview for the Travel Channel's Marvel Superheroes Guide to New York City (2004), Stan Lee said that the artist for the issue had drawn the Brooklyn Bridge, but that he (as editor) mistakenly labeled it the George Washington Bridge. This was corrected in newer prints of the issue.

Different bridges are depicted in subsequent adaptations of the storyline. Mary Jane Watson was thrown off the Queensboro Bridge in both Ultimate Spider-Man #25 and the Spider-Man movie, while in Spider-Man: The Animated Series, Mary Jane is thrown off the George Washington Bridge.

Cause of death

The comic features a "snap" sound effect next to Gwen Stacy's head in the panel in which Spider-Man's webbing catches her. In The Amazing Spider-Man #125 (Oct. 1973), Marvel Comics editor Roy Thomas wrote in the letters column that "it saddens us to have to say that the whiplash effect she underwent when Spidey's webbing stopped her so suddenly was, in fact, what killed her. In short, it was impossible for Peter to save her. He couldn't have swung down in time; the action he did take resulted in her death; if he had done nothing, she still would certainly have perished. There was no way out."

In the History Channel special Spider-Man Tech, Stan Lee states that her neck was indeed snapped.

Physicist and comic collector James Kakalios, in his book The Physics of Superheroes, states that in the real world, the whiplash effect would have killed her. The comic book Civil War: Casualties of War: Captain America/Iron Man (2007) concurred that the proximate cause of death was the sudden stop during a high-speed fall. An issue of Peter Parker: Spider-Man revisits the issue, and further confirms Gwen died of a broken neck due to the use of the webbing.

For some time, however, fans speculated that the shock of the fall itself caused Gwen Stacy's death, due to the Green Goblin telling Spider-Man in The Amazing Spider-Man #121, "Romantic idiot! She was dead before your webbing reached her! A fall from that height would kill anyone — before they struck the ground!" In the 1987 edition of The Official Handbook of the Marvel Universe, Gwen's death is attributed to the fall, not to Spider-Man's webbing. In the fourth issue of Marvels, it was reported that she died from the shock of the fall, however Phil, a photographer and witness, is unsure about exactly what kills her.

Replays
Several subsequent issues have echoed Gwen's death when others fell from great heights during Spider-Man's battles. On most occasions, he saves them by jumping after them and working with their momentum, rather than trying to stop them with his webbing (as he did in the What If? where he saves Gwen), most notably when he jumped off the same bridge to save Sarah Stacy.

In another storyline, the Green Goblin once again replays the scenario, this time with Spider-Man's wife Mary Jane Watson-Parker. As with Gwen, Mary Jane plummets toward her death (this time from the recoil from her gun when she shoots at the Green Goblin). Learning from his previous error, Spider-Man uses multiple weblines and catches every major joint, saving Mary Jane from suffering the same whiplash effect that killed Gwen. A similar event occurs when Spider-Man saves Anna Maria—the girlfriend of Otto Octavius during a time when he was in Spider-Man's body—when Green Goblin uses her as a hostage and throws her off a building after learning that his true enemy has returned, Peter reflecting as he catches Anna Maria that he has learned over time to catch every joint in moments like this to limit potential whiplash.

During the Civil War, both Iron Man and Captain America cited Gwen as argument for their opinions on the Superhuman Registration Act. Iron Man argued that if Spider-Man had received proper training as registered heroes were given, he would have saved her, while Captain America argued that Gwen was only in danger because the Goblin knew Spider-Man's identity, the Act requiring heroes to register their identities with the government.

After Jane Foster becomes the new Valkyrie, she is reminded of how Spider-Man failed to save someone in a similar situation when she is forced to use her shape-shifting weapon to catch the fatally wounded Heimdall as he falls from a building after being attacked by Bullseye, and expresses concern that her actions have made Heimdall's wounds worse, but Heimdall gives no indication that he blames Jane for his death.

Attempted resurrections
As John Romita Sr. recalls, Stan Lee's initial reaction towards Gwen Stacy's death was negative because he thought that Romita, Conway and Thomas had done it behind his back and he demanded that they bring her back immediately. Thomas, Romita, and other editorial board members, however, convinced him otherwise, stating that this would be an "embarrassing silliness" and could ruin the emotional impact of her death.

While developing the story for the Spider-Man: One More Day storyline along with Brian Michael Bendis, Mark Millar, Ed Brubaker and Dan Slott; Joe Quesada and J. Michael Straczynski made plans to resurrect Gwen Stacy along with Harry Osborn, who had been killed in The Spectacular Spider-Man #200 and ultimately revived during the story (though this Harry was later revealed to be a clone who later died himself during the "Kindred Rising" storyline).  Numerous Marvel writers and editors, however, lobbied for Stacy to remain dead, forcing Quesada and Straczynski to discard their idea upon frustratingly realizing that they were outnumbered. Among the changes to continuity going as far back as 1971, Straczynski's original script had, as a consequence of Mephisto erasing Spider-Man's and Mary Jane's marriage from reality, Gwen Stacy being restored to life as her death never happened as well her affair with Norman Osborn.

Gwen was ultimately resurrected, albeit temporarily, during the "Dead No More: The Clone Conspiracy" crossover event. In the story, Gwen is resurrected by Ben Reilly alongside other deceased Spider-Man supporting characters, initially helping him achieve his goals but eventually assisting Peter and dying after the two of them make amends with each other.

What If?
In a non-canonical parallel universe story in What If? #24 – "What If Gwen Stacy Had Lived?", Spider-Man saves Gwen by jumping after her rather than catching her with a web-line (in the same way he saved Mary Jane in the film), allowing him to cushion her from the impact as they hit the water and subsequently give her CPR. In the aftermath of this rescue, he proposed to Gwen after revealing his secret identity to her, and, in a subsequent confrontation with the Green Goblin, Norman Osborn finally fought off his evil side when Harry moved to protect him regardless of what he'd become. Their life, however, was not destined to be a happy one; to ensure his victory, the Goblin had sent J. Jonah Jameson proof of Spider-Man's real identity, which Jonah had subsequently published and used to acquire a warrant for Peter's arrest, thus forcing Peter to escape from the police mere moments after his wedding to Gwen. As the issue ended, Gwen departed with Joe "Robbie" Robertson, who promised Gwen that they would do whatever they could to help Peter.

In What If? vol. 2 #42 – "What If Spider-Man Had Kept His Six Arms?", Peter is able to prevent Gwen's death in "The Night Gwen Stacy Died" by using his additional arms to catch her as she falls.

At the end of the one-shot What If: The Other by Peter David, Peter (now calling himself "Poison") uses part of the Venom symbiote attached to him resurrect Gwen.

In What If? Punisher #1 – "What if Peter Parker became the Punisher?", Peter, who is the Punisher in addition to Spider-Man, is able to save Gwen by killing the Green Goblin and webbing her body to a suspended scaffold on the bridge. Feeling guilty over almost getting her killed, he quits being the Punisher to be with her, leaving his costume in a bin, where it is found by Frank Castle.

Reception
Gwen's death shocked Spider-Man readers, with some appreciating the bold move and others horrified by the unexpected demise of a popular character. In Amazing Spider-Man #125 (Oct 1973), an editorial comment on the letters page explained the creators' view:

Fans were not appeased by this explanation, and Romita says that Marvel received some death threats.

In other media

Television
"The Night Gwen Stacy Died" was adapted in Spider-Man: The Animated Series. In the episode "Chapter XIV: Turning Point", the Green Goblin hurtled Mary Jane Watson off the bridge, but instead of dying, she falls through a portal, unseen to Peter Parker believing she has fallen and perished in the water below. The episode's name is the same as the main cover caption of the first issue in "The Night Gwen Stacy Died" arc.
"The Night Gwen Stacy Died" is somewhat reenacted in the Ultimate Spider-Man cartoon series. Instead of Gwen Stacy, other female characters that have a connection to Spider-Man are the Green Goblin's would-be victims: White Tiger (Ava Ayala) in the episode "Ultimate", and Spider-Girl (Petra Parker) in the episode "The Spider-Verse (Part 1)".
"The Night Gwen Stacy Died" was loosely adapted in the 2016 four-part season finale of the third season of Agents of S.H.I.E.L.D., collectively known as "Fallen Agent", with Daisy Johnson and Lincoln Campbell respectively taking the roles of Spider-Man and Gwen Stacy. The episodes were marketed with a promotional poster for the event recreating the cover of The Amazing Spider-Man #121 with the series' cast (created by Greg Land, and also appearing as a variant cover for Civil War II #0), teasing the identity of the finale's titular Fallen Agent.

Films
"The Night Gwen Stacy Died" was adapted into the end of the 2002 Spider-Man film, with Mary Jane Watson again taking the role, although she did not die; Spider-Man managed to save her by jumping after her and catching her in person, subsequently battling the Green Goblin after lowering Mary Jane to safety, although Green Goblin dies similarly to how he did in the comics.
"The Night Gwen Stacy Died" was adapted in the 2014 film The Amazing Spider-Man 2. The Green Goblin—here Harry Osborn rather than Norman—drops Gwen Stacy through the top of a clock tower. Spider-Man saves her and knocks the Goblin off of his glider. The glider collides with the clock tower that Gwen is standing on, and she falls. Spider-Man catches her again and she dangles below until the turning clock gears cut the web Gwen is hanging from, just as the Goblin attacks him. After knocking aside the Goblin, Spider-Man dives, shooting a web to try an save her; but even though the web catches her, she is just above the ground and a cracking sound is heard, leaving the exact cause of death ambiguous. There is the possibility that she was killed by the sudden stop, with the cracking noise coming from a traumatic spinal fracture, or because she struck the ground with her head. In a deleted scene, Peter subsequently takes Harry's glider, hoists it above his head in rage and considers impaling him with it, but decides against it, leaving him to be arrested for her murder. The clock stops at 1:21, a reference to the issue of the comic book in which Gwen died. Additionally, one of the promotional posters for the film recreated the cover of The Amazing Spider-Man #121 with the film's cast. In the unmade The Amazing Spider-Man 3 (cancelled in favour of a reboot), Gwen would have then been resurrected with a symbiote as Carnage, loosely adapted from What If: The Other and the Ultimate Clone Saga.
"The Night Gwen Stacy Died" was reenacted in the 2019 film Happy Death Day 2U, with one of Tree Gelbman's deaths modeled after Gwen's, as depicted in The Amazing Spider-Man 2.
"The Night Gwen Stacy Died" was reenacted in the 2019 Marvel Cinematic Universe (MCU) film Spider-Man: Far From Home, where Mysterio drops Peter's crush MJ off of the Eiffel Tower in an illusion: the real MJ survives, while, like the Goblin, Mysterio accidentally kills himself with his own drones; the film additionally adapts a storyline from What If? #24 – "What If Gwen Stacy Had Lived?", having Mysterio (again replacing the Goblin) posthumously send documents to J. Jonah Jameson revealing Peter's secret identity as Spider-Man, which Jameson exposes to the world.
"The Night Gwen Stacy Died" was adapted into the end of the 2021 Sony's Spider-Man Universe (SSU) film Venom: Let There Be Carnage, with Anne Weying taking the role of Gwen, Eddie Brock and Venom taking the role of Spider-Man, and Cletus Kasady and Carnage taking the role of the Green Goblin; however, Annie does not die, as Eddie and Venom jointly use the latter's symbiote tendrils to save her by lowering her to safety into the arms of her waiting fiancé Dan Lewis at the bottom of a chapel they were at the top of, before returning to continue fighting Cletus and Carnage after they had tried to kill her. Anne's fall is specifically modeled after Gwen's death as depicted in The Amazing Spider-Man 2, as a subversion of the events depicted.
Elements from the aforementioned films and the original comic were featured in the 2021 MCU film Spider-Man: No Way Home, a film featuring characters from the Raimi films, Webb films, and the MCU via the plot element of the multiverse. The Green Goblin from the Raimi films kills the MCU version of Aunt May by attacking her with his glider and blowing up the floor he and MCU Peter were fighting on, leading Peter to become bitter and vengeful similar to how the comic version was after Gwen's death, with May's death similarly being a result of his own actions, despite the Goblin being the actual one who killed her. When the two alternate Peter Parkers arrive to console the MCU Peter, the Peter from the Webb films mentioned how he stopped pulling his punches after Gwen's death in The Amazing Spider-Man 2, implying he began using lethal force or took a more hardcore approach to handling criminals and warns his counterpart not to become like him. During the climax, the Peter from the Webb films manages to save MCU Peter's own girlfriend MJ from suffering a similar fate to Gwen as she falls from the Statue of Liberty by jumping after her and catching her in person. MCU Peter attempts to kill the Goblin with his own glider, similar to the 2002 film, and recreating The Amazing Spider-Man 2 deleted scene, but is stopped by the Peter from the Raimi films, and instead cures Norman of his insanity, which was slightly different from the comics where Peter although he pummeled Goblin stopped himself from killing him.

See also

References

External links
 

Comics about revenge
Comics about death
Comics by Gerry Conway
1973 in comics
Green Goblin